Charlotte Yhlen (later Olsen, 1839–1920), was the first female Swedish physician.

Charlotte Yhlen was the daughter of a shoemaker in Helsingborg. Her only education in Sweden was primary education. In Sweden, it was not yet permitted for females to study at universities when she emigrated to the United States in 1868. In America, however, she studied medicine at the Woman's Medical College of Pennsylvania, where she graduated as a physician in 1873. She thereby became the first Swedish woman to graduate as a physician from a university, though Karolina Widerström was the first woman to do so in Sweden.

She returned to Sweden, where she applied to practice medicine, but her foreign degree was not accepted there. However, the universities was opened to women in Sweden in 1870, and she was accepted as a student at the Uppsala University, but she never started to study there. The same year, she was elected the first female delegate at the Nordic Science Conference in Copenhagen.

Charlotte Yhlen returned to the United States, where she worked as a physician at the Woman's Hospital of Philadelphia and then with her own practice. In 1874, she married the Norwegian engineer Tinius Olsen. She retired in 1889.

References
 Elianne Riska: Medical Careers and Feminist Agendas: American, Scandinavian, and Russian ...
 http://www.lakartidningen.se/Aktuellt/Kultur/Kultur/2013/12/Hon-maste-flytta-fran-Sverige--for-att-fa-jobba-som-doktor/
 Brev till Rudolf Schmidt 1866-02-21 & 1866-06-24, Håndskriftsamlingens Brevbase, Det Kongelige bibliotek, Köpenhamn
 Fred Edge, Iron Rose, University of Manitoba press, 1992, s. 81
 Twenty-first annual announcement of the Woman’s medical college of Pennsylvania, Records of W/MCP Publications 1850–present, Archives & special collections, Drexel university college of Medicine
 A thesis on glaucoma, Records of W/MCP Medical Students 1850–1981, Archives & special collections, Drexel university college of Medicine
 Nils Eriksson, "I andans kraft, på sannings stråt-":De skandinaviska naturforskarmötena 1839–1936, Acta Universitatis Gothoburgensis, 1991, s. 230-31
 Maria Cederschiöld, En banbryterska: Skildringar från Ellen Fries’ studentår i Uppsala: Ur hennes bref och anteckningar, Stockholm, 1913
 Brev till Johannes Steenstrup 1899–1919, Håndskriftsamlingens Brevbase, Det Kongelige bibliotek, Köpenhamn

Further reading  
 

1839 births
1920 deaths
Swedish women physicians
19th-century Swedish physicians
Woman's Medical College of Pennsylvania alumni
19th-century women physicians